As I Try Not to Fall Apart is the sixth studio album by British post-punk band White Lies. The album was released on 18 February 2022 through PIAS. The Bonus Edition of the album was released on 21 October 2022 and features 4 additional tracks.

The album had four singles released ahead of its release: the title track, "I Don't Want to Go to Mars", "Am I Really Going to Die", and "Blue Drift". Bonus Edition tracks "Trouble In America" and "Breakdown Days" were also later released as singles.

Track listing

Personnel

White Lies 
 Harry McVeigh – lead vocal, guitar, keyboards
 Charles Cave – bass guitar, keyboards
 Jack Lawrence-Brown – drums, percussion

Production 
 Claudius Mittendorfer – producer (tracks 1, 2, 5–7 and 10) and mixing
 Ed Buller – producer (tracks 3, 4, 8 and 9)
 John Davis – mastering
 Richie Kennedy – engineer (tracks 1, 2, 5–7 and 10)
 James Mellor – engineer (tracks 1, 2, 5–7 and 10)
 Darren Lawson – engineer (tracks 3, 4, 8 and 9)
 Claude Vause – studio assistant
 Ed Farrell – studio assistant
 Annelise Keestra – design

Charts

References 

2022 albums
PIAS Recordings albums
White Lies (band) albums